is a role-playing video game developed and published by Square for the Family Computer. The third installment in the Final Fantasy series, it is the first numbered Final Fantasy game to feature the job-change system. The story revolves around four orphaned youths drawn to a crystal of light. The crystal grants them some of its power, and instructs them to go forth and restore balance to the world. Not knowing what to make of the crystal's pronouncements, but nonetheless recognizing the importance of its words, the four inform their adoptive families of their mission and set out to explore and bring back balance to the world.

The game was originally released in Japan on April 27, 1990. The original Famicom version sold 1.4 million copies in Japan. It had not been released outside Japan until a remake, also called Final Fantasy III, was developed by Matrix Software for the Nintendo DS on August 24, 2006. At that time, it was the only Final Fantasy game not previously released in North America or Europe. There had been earlier plans to remake the game for Bandai's WonderSwan Color handheld, as had been done with the first, second, and fourth installments of the series, but the game faced several delays and was eventually canceled after the premature cancellation of the platform. The Nintendo DS version of the game was positively received, selling nearly 2 million copies worldwide.

It was also released for many other systems: the Japanese Famicom version via the Virtual Console on July 21, 2009 (Wii) and January 8, 2014 (Wii U), an iOS port of the Nintendo DS remake on March 24, 2011, an Android port on March 12, 2012, a PlayStation Portable port in late September 2012 (downloadable-only format outside Japan via PlayStation Network) and a Windows port via Steam in 2014. An updated release based on the Famicom version of Final Fantasy III was released on Android, iOS, and Steam in 2021 as part of the Final Fantasy Pixel Remaster collection, marking the first time the original version of Final Fantasy III was released outside of Japan.

Gameplay

The gameplay of Final Fantasy III combines elements of the first two Final Fantasy games with new features. The turn-based combat system remains in place from the first two games, but hit points are now shown above the target following attacks or healing actions, rather than captioned as in the previous two games. Auto-targeting for physical attacks after a friendly or enemy unit is killed is also featured for the first time. Unlike subsequent games in the series, magical attacks are not auto-targeted in the same fashion.

The experience point system featured in Final Fantasy makes a return following its absence from Final Fantasy II. The character class system featured in the first game also reappears, with some modifications. Whereas in the original game the player chooses each character's class alignment at the start of the game and is then locked into that class for the duration of the game, Final Fantasy III introduces the "job system" for which the series would later become famous. Jobs are presented as interchangeable classes: in the Famicom version of the game, all four characters begin as "Onion Knights", with a variety of additional jobs becoming available as the game progresses. Any playable character has access to every currently available job and can change from job to job at will. Switching jobs consumes "capacity points" which are awarded to the entire party following every battle, much like gil. Different weapons, pieces of armor, and magic spells are utilized by each job. A character's level of proficiency at a particular job increases the longer the character remains with that job. Higher job levels increase the battle statistics of the character and reduce the cost in capacity points to switch to that job.

Final Fantasy III is the first game in the series to feature special battle commands such as "Steal" or "Jump", each of which is associated with a particular job ("Steal" is the Thief's specialty, while "Jump" is the Dragoon's forte). Certain jobs also feature innate, non-battle abilities, such as the Thief's ability to open passages that would otherwise require a special key item. Final Fantasy III is also the first game in the series to feature summoned creatures, which are called forth with the "Summon" skill.

Plot

Setting
One thousand years before the events in the game, on a floating continent hovering high above the surface of an unnamed planet, a technologically advanced civilization sought to harness the power of the four elemental crystals of light. They did not realize that they could not control such fundamental forces of nature. This power of light would have consumed the world itself had the light crystals not had their natural counterparts: the four dark elemental crystals. Disturbed by the sudden interruption of the careful balance between light and dark, four warriors were granted the power of the dark crystals to recapture the power of the light crystals. These so-called Dark Warriors succeeded in their quest, and restored harmony to the world. But their victory came too late to save the doomed civilization, whose culture was reduced to ruin, though their floating continent remained. On that continent, the circle of Gulgans, a race of blind soothsayers and fortune-tellers, predicted that these events will ultimately repeat.

Characters
Final Fantasy III focuses around four orphans from the remote village of Ur (while in the remakes players only begin as Luneth, slowly picking up the other 3 characters as they progress; a change from the original and from other early Final Fantasy titles), each starting off as an Onion Knight in the original game.

 is the antagonist the party seeks to stop for most of the game, though he is eventually revealed to merely be a pawn of the : a malevolent and vicious deity who wishes to push the world into a state of chaos and destruction by upsetting the equilibrium between light and darkness, allowing the Void to consume the world. Appearing in a female-like form, the Cloud of Darkness refers to herself in first-person plural because her two tentacles have minds of their own. Although she initially defeats the Light Warriors, they are resurrected with Unei and Doga's help. Then, with help from the Dark Warriors, they defeat the Cloud of Darkness, saving the world.

Story
An earthquake opens up a previously hidden cavern in Altar Cave near the village of Ur on the floating continent. Four young orphans under the care of Topapa, the village elder, explore the earthquake's impact and come across a crystal of light. The crystal grants them a portion of its power, and instructs them to go forth and restore balance to the world. Not knowing what to make of the crystal's pronouncements, but nonetheless recognizing the importance of its words, the four inform their adoptive family of their mission and set out to explore an overworld outside the area in which they were brought up, in order to bring balance back to the world.

Their adventures lead them to discover that there lies a whole world beyond the boundaries of the floating continent upon which they were living. In the world below, they discover a warlock named Xande, one of three apprentices to the legendary Archmage Noah, is trying to possess the crystals of light, so as to bring forth chaos and disorder. The four warriors eventually arrive at the Crystal Tower where they discover that the Cloud of Darkness is the source of the recent events. The Cloud attempts to create a similar situation to the Flood of Light a millennium earlier so that the world is pulled into the void. The Light Warriors traverse into the domain of the dark crystals to free the imprisoned Dark Warriors and defeat the Cloud of Darkness, thereby restoring the crystals and balance to the world. In the DS remake, there are several "side quests" that can also be completed.

The story is virtually the same in the remakes, but with some major differences in the introductory sequence. In the remakes, Luneth goes to the Altar Cave alone, but while exploring he trips and falls into a hole created by the earthquake. He is then beset by goblins, and while he is frantically searching for a way out, he comes upon a room, where he is ambushed by a Land Turtle. After defeating it, he finds the Wind Crystal, which tells him that he has been chosen as a Warrior of Light, destined to restore balance to the world, and there are three others like him, but before Luneth can ask it to elaborate, he is teleported to the surface. He returns to Ur, but Elder Topapa does not elucidate much on the matter besides stating that someone had brought him to Topapa. Going to a corner of town, Luneth finds his friend Arc being bullied by some of the kids. When Luneth intervenes, the kids run away, with Arc running away to Kazus, proving that he is not scared of ghosts.

Luneth chases Arc to Kazus and, upon reuniting with Arc, discovers that the rumors of a curse on Kazus are not false. The people there are see-through, and one such person, Cid of Canaan, instructs the two boys to take his airship and look for Refia, the mythril smith Takka's adoptive daughter. They find her on the airship, and accompany her to Castle Sasune as per her suggestion. There, they meet Ingus, a soldier of Sasune who had been away during the curse's happening. He joins the trio after an audience with the king, who instructs them to find his daughter, Sara. They catch up to her in the Sealed Cave behind a wall that could only be accessible by interacting with 'the skeleton key'. With her accompanying them, they battle the monster who cast the curse: the Djinn. Just as Sara seals the Djinn away, however, Luneth, Arc, Refia and Ingus all disappear before her eyes. As it transpires, the wind crystal had summoned the four youths in order to grant them a portion of its power which allows you access to the jobs Thief, Warrior, Black Mage, White Mage, and Red Mage. After this, Luneth and company reunite with Sara at Castle Sasune. She completes the process of dispelling the Djinn's curse by tossing the ring into a fountain of water underneath the castle, but becomes depressed when Luneth reveals that he and his companions must leave at once. After Sara stops crying long enough to see them off, they go back to Kazus, where Takka drags Refia home. The three boys consult with Cid, then with Takka, who builds a mythril ram on the ship. Refia is not with Takka when the boys return to ask for a mythril ram, and when the party once more finds her aboard Cid's airship, the player would be able to piece together why she wasn't with him. She had told Takka that she is a Warrior of Light like the boys, and therefore has to leave. The new introductory sequence ends with the airship being used to demolish the boulder in Nelv Valley along with the ship.

Development
Director and story writer Hironobu Sakaguchi, designer Hiromichi Tanaka, character designer Yoshitaka Amano, scenario writer Kenji Terada, and music composer Nobuo Uematsu returned from the two previous Final Fantasy games to contribute to the development of Final Fantasy III. As with the previous two installments of the series, Final Fantasy III was programmed for the Famicom by Nasir Gebelli. It was the last original Final Fantasy title on which Gebelli worked. Midway through the development of the game, Gebelli was forced to return to Sacramento, California from Japan due to an expired work visa. The rest of the development staff followed him to Sacramento with necessary materials and equipment and finished production of the game there. The completed game was one of the largest ever released for the Famicom, published on a 512 KB cartridge, the second-highest capacity available for the console. Like many console role-playing games of the era, Final Fantasy III is noted for its difficulty.

Square developed and released Final Fantasy III during the same period that Nintendo released its 16-bit Super Famicom console, intended as the successor to the original 8-bit Famicom. Designer Hiromichi Tanaka said that the original game was never released outside Japan because Square was focused on developing for Nintendo's new console:

Square planned to localize and release the game outside Japan, but the game's localization's plans were scrapped.

Music

The music of the Final Fantasy III was composed by regular series composer Nobuo Uematsu. Final Fantasy III Original Sound Version, a compilation album of almost all of the music in the game, was released by Square/NTT Publishing in 1991, and subsequently re-released by NTT Publishing in 1994 and 2004. A vocal arrangement album entitled Final Fantasy III Yūkyū no Kaze Densetsu, or literally Final Fantasy III Legend of the Eternal Wind, contains a selection of musical tracks from the game, performed by Nobuo Uematsu and Dido, a duo composed of Michiaki Kato and Shizuru Ohtaka. The album was released by Data M in 1990 and by Polystar in 1994.

Selected tracks the game were featured in various Final Fantasy arranged music compilation albums, including Final Fantasy: Pray and Final Fantasy: Love Will Grow (with lyrical renditions performed by singer Risa Ohki), and the second and third albums from Uematsu's progressive metal group, The Black Mages. Several tracks from the game were subsequently remixed and featured in later Square or Square Enix titles, including Chocobo Racing and Final Fantasy Fables: Chocobo's Dungeon. Several pieces from the soundtrack remain popular today, and have been performed numerous times in Final Fantasy orchestral concert series such as the Tour de Japon: Music from Final Fantasy concert series and the Distant Worlds - Music from Final Fantasy series.

Cancelled WonderSwan Color remake
Bandai unveiled their WonderSwan Color handheld system in 2000 and had immediately headed up a deal with Square to release enhanced remakes of their first three Final Fantasy titles on the new console. Although Final Fantasy and II were both released within a year of the announcement, Final Fantasy III was ultimately delayed from its late 2001 release date, even after Bandai picked up the game's publishing rights. While a port of Final Fantasy IV was eventually released for the WonderSwan Color, Square remained silent regarding Final Fantasy III. Although the game was never formally cancelled, the official website was taken offline once production of the WonderSwan Color consoles ceased in 2002.

In 2007, Hiromichi Tanaka explained in an interview that the WonderSwan Color remake had been abandoned because the size and structure of the coding of the original Famicom game was too difficult to recreate on the WonderSwan Color:

Versions and re-releases
There are two distinct Final Fantasy III versions: the original 2D Famicom version, and a completely remade 3D version.

Reception

Upon release, Famicom Tsūshin (now Famitsu) gave the Famicom version a score of 36 out of 40, based on a panel of four reviewers giving it ratings of 9, 9, 10 and 8 out of 10. This made it one of their three highest-rated games of 1990, along with Dragon Quest IV and F-Zero, both of which scored 37 out of 40. It was also one of the magazine's six highest-rated games up until 1990, along with Dragon Quest II, Dragon Quest III and Zelda II: The Adventure of Link.

In Famicom Tsūshins 1990 Game of the Year awards, Final Fantasy III was voted the runner-up for the Grand Prize, with 37,101 points, behind Dragon Quest IV. In 2006, readers of the Japanese gaming magazine Famitsu voted the original Final Fantasy III the eighth best video game of all-time, above Dragon Quest IV. As of March 31, 2003, the original Famicom game had shipped 1.4 million copies in Japan.

Legacy
From 1991 to 1992, Kadokawa Shoten's Famicom gaming magazine,  published , a manga serialization of Final Fantasy III illustrated by Yu Kinutani. Based on the original story by Kenji Terada, the manga chronicles the events that take place throughout the course of the game. It was subsequently collected into three tankōbon under Kadokawa Shoten's Dragon Comics imprint: Legend of the Eternal Wind 1, 2, and 3.

The Onion Knight and the Cloud of Darkness are the respective hero and villainess representing Final Fantasy III in Dissidia Final Fantasy, where they are voiced by Jun Fukuyama and Masako Ikeda, respectively, in the Japanese version, and by Aaron Spann and Laura Bailey, respectively, in English. The characters reprise their roles in the sequels, Dissidia 012 and Dissidia NT.

See also
 List of Square Enix video game franchises

Further reading

Notes

References

External links

 
 
 Official North American website
 
 Official Japanese website 

Role-playing video games
Android (operating system) games
Final Fantasy video games
IOS games
Japanese role-playing video games
Matrix Software games
Multiplayer and single-player video games
Nintendo DS games
Nintendo Entertainment System games
Nintendo Wi-Fi Connection games
Ouya games
PlayStation Network games
PlayStation Portable games
Video games developed in Japan
Video games developed in the United States
Video games featuring female protagonists
Virtual Console games
Virtual Console games for Wii U
Windows games
Windows Phone games
1990 video games
Video games scored by Nobuo Uematsu